The Challenge... A Tribute to Modern Art is a 1974 American documentary film directed by Herbert Kline. It was nominated for an Academy Award for Best Documentary Feature.

See also
 List of American films of 1974
 Orson Welles filmography

References

External links

1974 films
American documentary films
1974 documentary films
1970s English-language films
Films directed by Herbert Kline
1970s American films